The Basurto Building is located in the Condesa area of Mexico City, a work of architect Francisco J. Serrano, built between 1940 and 1945. Its design is post- Art Deco. It is fourteen storeys tall, unusually high for the constructions in the area of that period giving it iconic status and an emblem of Condesa. It is located on Avenida México, half a block from Parque México to the south and Plaza Popocatépetl to the north.

Gallery

References

External links 

Buildings and structures in Mexico City
Art Deco architecture in Mexico
Condesa
Residential buildings completed in 1945